The women's individual pursuit events at the 2012 Summer Paralympics took place on 30 August – 2 September at London Velopark.

Classification
Cyclists are given a classification depending on the type and extent of their disability. The classification system allows cyclists to compete against others with a similar level of function. The class number indicates the severity of impairment with "1" being most impaired.

Pursuit cycling classes are:
B: Blind and visually impaired cyclists use a tandem bicycle with a sighted pilot on the front.
C 1–5: Cyclists with an impairment that affects their legs, arms and/or trunk, but are capable of using a standard bicycle.

B

The women's 3 km individual pursuit (B) took place on 2 September.

C1–3

The women's 3 km individual pursuit (C1–3) took place on 30 August.

C4

The women's 3 km individual pursuit (C4) took place on 30 August.

C5

The women's 3 km individual pursuit (C5) took place on 30 August.

References 

Women's individual pursuit
Para